Sand Serpent is a Wild Mouse roller coaster located at Busch Gardens Tampa Bay in Tampa, Florida. The ride originally operated at sister park Busch Gardens Williamsburg in Williamsburg, Virginia as Wild Izzy in 1996 and later as Wilde Maus from 1997 to 2003. When the roller coaster relocated to the current park, it was renamed Cheetah Chase from 2004 to 2011 before coming into its current name.  

Sand Serpent was manufactured by Mack Rides and designed by Werner Stengel. Upon opening at Busch Gardens Williamsburg, the roller coaster was received generally well by the public, though its relocation at Busch Gardens Tampa Bay was minimally covered.

History 

In December 1995, Busch Gardens Williamsburg announced Wild Izzy, a Mack Rides Wild Mouse roller coaster, would be added to the park for the 1996 season in the Oktoberfest section. It was named after the mascot of the 1996 Summer Olympics, since Busch Gardens was a sponsor of the games. Originally in January, it was reported that Wild Izzy would open later in March. Though in March, the roller coaster was announced to open in April. Wild Izzy officially opened on April 12. After the 1996 season, it was given a European theme and renamed to Wilde Maus. 

In November 2003, filings by the park for a new attraction were uncovered in James City County that would replace the Wilde Maus roller coaster. After seven years of operation at Busch Gardens Williamsburg, the roller coaster closed in 2003 where it was removed and replaced with the defunct dark ride, Curse of DarKastle in 2005. In December 2003, the St. Petersburg Times reported that the Wilde Maus would be shipped to Busch Gardens Tampa Bay in January 2004 and be renamed to Cheetah Chase. The roller coaster opened on February 28, in the Timbuktu section of the park.

Cheetah Chase replaced the defunct Crazy Camel flat ride that opened up with the Timbuktu section of the park back in 1980. In 2011, the ride was rethemed from Cheetah Chase to Sand Serpent. This was done to reduce confusion with the park's new attraction, Cheetah Hunt. The roller coaster is now situated in the Pantopia section of the park, which was renamed with the introduction of Falcon's Fury, the park's signature drop tower.

Characteristics 
Sand Serpent is a stock Wild Mouse roller coaster model manufactured by Mack Rides and designed by Werner Stengel. Specifically, the ride model is the "Wild Maus", and the "Compact Mobile" version. Originally, the track was green and had yellow supports, with each car featuring colors from the Olympic rings along with lightning bolts and stars. The current iteration features blue track and orange supports, with the cars variously colored solid blue, orange, or red.

The roller coaster operates with single cars that navigate the layout. The four riders per car are arranged in two rows with two seats across each. Unlike similar Wild Mouse roller coasters produced by Mack Rides, the Sand Serpent model does not feature dips in the track prior to the brake run.

Ride experience 
Following the lift, the car descends downward and goes into a series of 180-degree turns that run parallel to each other. After the series of turns, the car makes a wider continuous downward turn until it straightens out. The car then heads forward into a hill and two tight left turns. Thereafter the car dips downward and ascends another hill where it takes another two left turns. The car then descends into another drop where the train heads upward into two tight left turns. Following the turn, the car descends into a hill and into the final brake run where it makes a final left turn into the station. One cycle of the roller coaster takes around two minutes to complete.

Reception 
Upon its original opening at Busch Gardens Williamsburg, the roller coaster was generally well received by the public. In the Daily Press' coverage, Michael McCary, a musician present, had described the roller coaster jokingly "not for tall people", as the force banged up his knees. Other guests during its opening stated that it was "scarier than you might think", relating it with that of the steel roller coaster Drachen Fire. In covering the state of Virginia's amusement parks, writers of The Star Democrat had described it as "distinctly different" from others because of its "jerky turns and quick dips" that would appeal to everyone. With its relocation to Busch Gardens Tampa Bay, the roller coaster was minimally covered by newspapers during its quiet debut in February 2004.

See also 

 List of attractions at Busch Gardens Tampa
 Scorpion (roller coaster), another roller coaster situated within the Pantopia section of the park
 Wild Mouse (Hersheypark), a similar Wild Mouse roller coaster produced by Mack Rides

References

External links

Roller coasters in Florida
Roller coasters in Tampa, Florida
Roller coasters introduced in 2004
Busch Gardens Tampa Bay
Amusement rides that closed in 2003
2004 establishments in Florida